Rupayan City, is a city development Company in Uttara Model Town. It is close to sector -12 of Uttara Model Town and covered by Rupayan Group.

Project 
Total area of Rupayan City Uttara project is around 150 bigha land. This project is one of the largest township projects in Bangladesh. It has residentials apartments, shopping malls, schools, mosques and office spaces. The project has 4 phase: 3 residential and 1 commercial. 2 of the residential phases Majestic & Grand are the CONDO phase, and SkyVilla is the villa & Penthouse. The project consists of 63% open space.

References 

Uttara
Neighbourhoods in Dhaka